Associazione Sportiva Stella Azzura is an Italian amateur basketball club based in Rome. It plays in the third division Serie B as of the 2015–16 season. The club is mainly known for its excellent youth teams, which participate in European competitions such as the Next Generation Tournament.

History
Stella Azzura was founded in 1938 by youngsters playing on a pitch in the courtyard of the Collegio San Giuseppe - Istituto De Merode in Rome.
The side played in the first division Serie A from 1954 to 1966, then for two other seasons before another period from 1974 to 1980, disappearing from the professional leagues after being relegated from the Serie A2 in 1982.

In May 2015, Stella Azzurra won its first ever national Under-19 title.

In 2018, Stella's under-18 team were the runners-up at the EuroLeague Basketball Next Generation Tournament, losing to BC Lietuvos rytas in the final.

Honours

Under-18 Team
EuroLeague Basketball Next Generation Tournament
Runners-up (1): 2017–18

Notable players
 Andrea Bargnani '02-'03
 Robert Bobroczky '14-'15
 Stephen Thompson Jr.

Notable coaches
 Valerio Bianchini '74-'79

References

External links
Lega Nazionale Pallacanestro profile  Retrieved 24 August 2015
Serie A historical results  Retrieved 24 August 2015

1938 establishments in Italy
Basketball teams established in 1938
Basketball in Rome
Basketball teams in Lazio
Sports clubs in Rome